Atrichomelina is a genus of flies in the family Sciomyzidae, the marsh flies or snail-killing flies.

Biology
The larvae kill and consume aquatic pulmonate snails of various species.

Species
A. pubera (Loew, 1862)

References

Sciomyzidae
Sciomyzoidea genera